"Way We Are" is a song by British electronic musician Kove featuring vocals from Melissa Steel. It was released as a digital download on 13 July 2014 in the Netherlands. The song has peaked at number 30 on the UK Singles Chart, number 38 on the Scottish Singles Chart and number seven on the UK Dance Chart.

The song appeared in a nightclub scene in 'Whoever He Is', the second ever episode of the TV series Power.

Music video
A music video to accompany the release of "Way We Are" was first released onto YouTube on 2 June 2014, at a total length of three minutes and twenty-two seconds.

Track listing

Chart performance
On 16 July 2014 the song was at number 17 on The Official Chart Update. On July 20, 2014, the song entered the UK Singles Chart at number 30, the song also entered the UK Dance Chart at number 7 and number 38 on the Scottish Singles Chart.

Charts

Release history

References

2014 singles
2014 songs
Kove (musician) songs
MTA Records singles
Melissa Steel songs